James Hingston Tuckey (August 1776 – 4 October 1816) was an Irish-born British explorer and a captain in the Royal Navy. Some sources mistakenly refer to him as James Kingston Tuckey.

Tuckey was born at Greenhill, near Mallow, August 1776. He went to sea at an early age, and in 1793 was received into the navy. From the first he saw a good deal of active service, and he was more than once wounded. Amongst other services, he made a survey of Port Phillip District. On his return to England he published an Account of the Voyage to establish a Colony at Port Phillip. The Calcutta was captured by the French on a voyage from St. Helena in 1805, and Lieutenant Tuckey suffered an imprisonment of nearly nine years in France, during which time he married Miss Margaret Stuart, a fellow prisoner, and prepared a work on Maritime Geography and Statistics, published after his release.

In 1814 he was promoted to the rank of commander, and in February 1816 he sailed to explore the River Congo in the schooner , accompanied by the stores ship Dorothy. The expedition aimed to find if there was a connection between the Congo and Niger basins of western and central Africa. Tuckey sailed up the river from its mouth but found that the lower river is not navigable due to rapids (later called the Yellala Falls) above Matadi. He only found ruins of the Portuguese colony and moribund Catholic missions. He suggested sending Protestant missionaries to the Congo. He explored the river up to Isangila. Most of the officers and crew died of fever and Tuckey himself died on 14 October 1816, aged 40,  in Moanda, on the coast of today's DR Congo. The expedition was a failure but raised interest in the exploration of Africa.

Tuckey was described as tall, and had been handsome, but long and arduous service broke down his constitution, and by thirty he was grey-haired and nearly bald. Further it is described that his countenance was pleasing and pensive; he was gentle and kind in his manners, cheerful in conversation, and indulgent to those under his command.

Named after
A species of flowering plants named Euphorbia tuckeyana is named for him, named by Philip Barker Webb in 1849; they are native to the Cape Verde Islands.

Works

References

1776 births
1816 deaths
Irish explorers
British explorers
Explorers of Australia
Explorers of Africa
Royal Navy officers
People from County Cork
19th-century Anglo-Irish people
Napoleonic Wars prisoners of war held by France
British prisoners of war (Napoleonic Wars)
Royal Navy personnel of the Napoleonic Wars
19th-century Irish botanists